The 2017 East Tennessee State Buccaneers football team represented East Tennessee State University (ETSU) in the 2017 NCAA Division I FCS football season and are in the second year of their second stint as football members of the Southern Conference (SoCon). They are led by third-year head coach Carl Torbush and, for the first time, play all their home games at William B. Greene Jr. Stadium. They finished the season 4–7, 2–6 in SoCon play to finish in eighth place.

On December 8, head coach Carl Torbush announced his retirement. He finished at ETSU with a three-year record of 11–22.

Schedule

 Source:

Game summaries

Limestone

at James Madison

The Citadel

Mercer

at Furman

Robert Morris

Western Carolina

Wofford

VMI

at Samford

at Chattanooga

References

East Tennessee State
East Tennessee State Buccaneers football seasons
East Tennessee State Buccaneers football